The 1994 California gubernatorial election was held on November 8, 1994, in the midst of that year's Republican Revolution. Incumbent Republican Pete Wilson easily won re-election over his main challenger, Democratic State Treasurer Kathleen Brown, the daughter of Pat Brown and younger sister of Jerry Brown, both of whom had previously served as governor. Although Wilson initially trailed Brown in the polls as a result of the state's faltering economy, his signature opposition to affirmative action and state services for illegal immigrants (with the associated Proposition 187) eventually led to his win. Wilson won 25% of the African American vote and 15% of the Latino vote, which was widely attributed to his support of Prop 187.

Primary elections
They were held on June 3, 1994.

Democratic

Candidates 

 Kathleen Brown, Incumbent Treasurer, sister of former Governor Jerry Brown and daughter of former Governor Pat Brown
 John Garamendi, Incumbent Insurance Commissioner, candidate for Governor in 1982, and Controller in 1986
 Tom Hayden, State Senator, Activist, former President of SDS, and candidate for Senate in 1976
 Charles Pineda, Jr.
 Jonathan Trip
 Mark Calney

Republican

Candidates 

 Pete Wilson, Incumbent
 Ron K. Unz, Businessman
 Jim Hart
 Louis D'Arrigo

General election

Polling

Results
Final results from the Secretary of State of California.

Results by county

References

External links
Statement of vote '94

Gubernatorial
1994
1994 United States gubernatorial elections